Otto Fredrikson (born 30 November 1981) is a Finnish former football goalkeeper. Fredrikson was born in the unilingually Finnish-speaking municipality of Valkeakoski, but has Swedish heritage.



Club career

Tervarit

Fredrikson's career began in OLS, but he transferred to another Oulu based team Tervarit for seasons 2000–2001.

Borussia Mönchengladbach

During season 2001–02, he transferred to German Borussia Mönchengladbach. Fredrikson was at that time one of the most promising footballers in Finland. He represented Borussia Mönchengladbach until season 2005–06. During the years in Borussia he did not gain any caps in the first team, but did gain 15 caps in the reserves team. During seasons 2004 and 2005 he was loaned to Finnish club FF Jaro where he played 52 matches.

Lillestrøm

From 2006 to 2009, Fredrikson represented Norwegian club Lillestrøm. He gained 53 caps.

Spartak Nalchik

In February 2010, Fredrikson transferred to Russian PFK Spartak Nalchik. He made 48 appearances in the Russian league before suffering an injury in international friendly match between Finland and Turkey on 2012.

He did not re-emerge until 2014, when joining Lørenskog at the Norwegian third tier. In 2015, he signed for Kongsvinger, also a third-tier team, albeit formerly in the Norwegian Premier League. In the summer of 2015 he signed for Vålerenga on an emergency loan deal because Michael Langer was injured and Lars Hirschfeld is playing Gold Cup for Canada.

International career
He made his debut for the Finnish national team on 29 May 2008 against Turkey. After Jussi Jääskeläinen announced his retirement from international football, Fredrikson was the number one choice for Finland. During fall 2010, he started three out of four of Finland's Euro 2012 qualification games. However, Fredrikson has been away from the squad since May 2012, when he got injured before the friendly match against Turkey.

Club statistics

Honours

Club
Lillestrøm
Norwegian Football Cup: 2007

References

External links
 
 
 
 
 Otto Fredrikson Interview

1981 births
Living people
People from Valkeakoski
Lillestrøm SK players
FC Haka players
Borussia Mönchengladbach players
Borussia Mönchengladbach II players
PFC Spartak Nalchik players
Finnish footballers
Finland youth international footballers
Finland under-21 international footballers
Finland international footballers
Finnish expatriate footballers
Finnish expatriate sportspeople in Germany
Expatriate footballers in Germany
Finnish expatriate sportspeople in Norway
Expatriate footballers in Norway
Finnish expatriate sportspeople in Russia
Expatriate footballers in Russia
Veikkausliiga players
Eliteserien players
Norwegian First Division players
Norwegian Second Division players
Russian Premier League players
Kongsvinger IL Toppfotball players
Vålerenga Fotball players
Finnish people of Swedish descent
Association football goalkeepers
Oulun Luistinseura players
Sportspeople from Pirkanmaa